Hoseynabad-e Shomali Rural District is a rural district (dehestan) in Saral District, Divandarreh County, Kurdistan Province, Iran. At the 2006 census, its population was 3,603, in 754 families. The rural district has 14 villages.

References 

Rural Districts of Kurdistan Province
Divandarreh County